Austin High School is a public high school located in Austin, Indiana.

Athletics
Austin High School's athletic teams are the Eagles, and they compete in the Mid-Southern Conference of Indiana. The school offers a wide range of athletics including:

Cross country running (men's and women's)
Volleyball
Soccer
Tennis (men's and women's)
Golf (men's and women's) 
Basketball (men's and women's) 
Baseball
Softball
Track and field (men's and women's)

Basketball
The 2009-2010 Lady Eagles basketball team won the IHSAA 2A Women's Basketball State Championship beating Bishop Luers High School (70-65). To date, it is the only athletic state championship in school history.

See also
 List of high schools in Indiana

References

External links
 Official website

Buildings and structures in Scott County, Indiana
Public high schools in Indiana
Education in Scott County, Indiana